This is a list of literature-related events in 1487.

Events
Erasmus writes to Servatius Rogerus from the monastery of Steyn.

Works
Niccolò da Correggio - Fabula di Cefalo.
Heinrich Kramer & Jacob Sprenger - Malleus Maleficarum.

Births
date unknown
Petar Hektorović, Croatian poet (died 1572)
Ottmar Luscinius, biblical commentation (died 1537)
Macropedius, humanist writer and dramatist (died 1558)

Deaths
October 22 - Antonio Bettini, theologian (born 1396)
date unknown - Jaume Safont, Catalan poet (born (1420)

References

 
Literature
Literature by year